University of the Pacific (Pacific or UOP) is a private Methodist-affiliated university with its main campus in Stockton, California, and graduate campuses in San Francisco and Sacramento. It claims to be California's first university, the first independent coeducational campus in California, and the first conservatory of music and first medical school on the West Coast.

Pacific was chartered on July 10, 1851, in Santa Clara, California, under the name California Wesleyan College. The school moved to San Jose in 1871 and then to Stockton in 1923. Pacific is accredited by the WASC Senior College and University Commission. In addition to its liberal arts college and graduate school, Pacific has schools of business, dentistry, education, engineering, international studies, law, music, pharmacy, and health sciences.

It is home to the papers of environmental pioneer John Muir in Pacific's Holt-Atherton Special Collections and Archives. The university also has a John Muir Center that hosts a Muir Symposium to encourage the use of John Muir's Papers. At Pacific's William Knox Holt Memorial Library, there is a museum style presentational space for Muir's Papers. The Muir Experience has on display physical and digital exhibits to inspire user interaction with Muir's work.

History 
Pacific was founded on July 10, 1851, in Santa Clara. It was originally named California Wesleyan College, but one month later, it petitioned to have its name changed to the University of the Pacific. In 1858, the college opened the first medical school on the West Coast, the Medical Department of the University of the Pacific. The medical school was later affiliated with University College under the name Cooper Medical College, and in 1908 it was taken over by Stanford University and became the Stanford University School of Medicine.

In 1871, the campus was moved to San Jose, to an area that came to be known as the College Park neighborhood, and opened its doors to women, becoming the first independent co-educational campus in California. In 1878, the Conservatory of Music was established at Pacific, making it the first of its kind west of the Mississippi River. In 1896, Napa College merged with the college. In 1911, the name was changed to College of the Pacific (COP).

In 1923, the campus relocated from the Bay Area to the city of Stockton becoming the first private four-year university in the Central Valley. In 1925, the San Jose campus was sold to Santa Clara College which moved its Santa Clara Prep to the campus and renamed it Bellarmine College Preparatory.

The university expanded into graduate and professional education in the 1950s, establishing the School of Pharmacy in 1955 and the Graduate School in 1956. The School of Engineering was established in 1957. In 1961, the university resumed using the name University of the Pacific.

In 1962, Pacific merged with the San Francisco College of Physicians and Surgeons (established in 1896 in San Francisco), and then in 1966, with the McGeorge School of Law (established in 1924 in Sacramento).

In the late 1960s, when federal law surrounding funding of church-associated universities came into question, Pacific stopped receiving funding from the United Methodist Church, but maintains its affiliation with the church while operating as a non-denominational school.
Also in the 1960s, three new colleges were established that were modeled after British universities Oxford and Cambridge, integrating faculty and students into distinct living and learning communities: Raymond College (1962) was introduced as an accelerated, interdisciplinary liberal arts program in which students could shape their courses of study; Elbert Covell College (1963) was a unique inter-American college, with half its students from the U.S. and half from Latin America and classes taught in Spanish; and Callison College (1967) focused on non-western studies, giving students the opportunity to spend a year of their studies in Asia. These independent colleges merged with the rest of the university in 1982. 
  
In 2013, the university received an estate gift of $125 million from Robert and Jeanette Powell. It is the largest gift in the university's history. This gift increased Pacific's endowment to $334 million. That same year, Pacific awarded its highest honor, the Order of Pacific, to the Powells.

In fall 2018, the university announced a planned tuition increase and budget cuts. This was the third consecutive year of such plans. In response to these financial plans and the perceived secrecy with which they had been developed, faculty voted "no confidence" in the university's president Pamela Eibeck and students protested.

In May 2019, the university's board of regents approved a new health school, which launched in fall 2020 with four new graduate health care programs. The board also approved merging the Gladys L. Benerd School of Education with University College to form Benerd College, a new school focused on innovative educational programs with flexible pricing and delivery methods, including hybrid and online programs for working adults.

Campuses

Stockton Campus 

The Stockton Campus, featuring a tower, rose gardens, architectural columns, brick-faced buildings, and numerous trees, has been used in Hollywood films, due to its aesthetic likeness to East Coast Ivy League universities: High Time, Raiders of the Lost Ark, Kingdom of the Crystal Skull, The Sure Thing, Dead Man on Campus, All the Kings Men, Flubber (film), and Dreamscape, among others. Part of Disney's 1973 film The World's Greatest Athlete was also shot at Pacific.

The Stockton Campus is home to three main residential halls: Grace Covell Hall, Southwest Hall, and the Quad Buildings. The Quads are composed of several separate smaller residence halls in proximity to each other. Grace Covell is the largest residence hall on campus holding more than 350 students. Junior and seniors can find housing in the University Townhouses on the northwest side of campus, McCaffrey Center Apartments located in the center of campus or in the three apartment buildings: Monagan Hall, Chan Family Hall, and Calaveras Hall, which is named after the river that flows through the campus, the Calaveras River. There are also fraternity and sorority houses located on campus.

In 2008, the university opened the Don and Karen DeRosa University Center (DUC), at a cost of $38 million, to centralize all campus student-centered activities. The DUC houses a central dining hall, student cafe, pub, bookstore and conference centers, replacing facilities in the McCaffrey Center. The university also built a new $20 million Biological Sciences Center in 2008 that provides advanced classroom and laboratory facilities for students studying the natural sciences and the health sciences.

The university opened the LEED (Leadership in Energy and Environmental Design) Gold-certified John T. Chambers Technology Center, home of the university's School of Engineering and Computer Science, in 2010. Calaveras Hall, a new apartment-style residence hall, opened in 2018. In 2019, the university renovated the William Knox Holt Memorial Library.

The campus is home to Morris Chapel, a non-denominational church.

Sacramento Campus 
Pacific's 13-acre Sacramento Campus houses graduate and professional programs and a degree completion program in the Oak Park neighborhood, south of downtown. It consists of 24 buildings, including academic facilities, four residential facilities, and a fitness center/pool.

The campus includes the McGeorge School of Law, which is the only law school approved by the American Bar Association in Sacramento County. In 2015, Pacific began a transformation of its Sacramento Campus by adding graduate and professional programs. The campus now houses the School of Health Sciences, alongside McGeorge, with programs focused on law, health sciences, organizational leadership, and public policy.

San Francisco Campus 

Pacific's San Francisco Campus is located in San Francisco's South of Market neighborhood, containing classrooms, administrative offices, a simulation laboratory and clinics offering dental care to the public through the Dugoni School of Dentistry. The San Francisco Campus also includes graduate programs in analytics, audiology, food studies, and music therapy.

Campus sustainability efforts 

The university strives to promote environmental responsibility. Students are given opportunities to take part in sustainability service projects through the M.O.V.E. (Mountains, Ocean, Valley Experience) program. The on-campus dining services participates in the Farm to Fork Program, buying food locally where feasible. In 2009, students from the Residence for Earth and Environmental Living and Learning (a campus residential learning community), the Students for Environmental Action, and the Department of Earth and Environmental Sciences designed and implemented the "Tap That" campaign, whose goal was to inform students, faculty and staff about the effects of disposable water bottles on the environment.

The university has been listed in the Sierra Club's list of "Cool Schools, " of universities that value sustainability. The university opened several LEED-certified buildings, including the Don and Karen DeRosa University Center, the John T. Chambers Technology Center, and the Vereschagin Alumni House and has an interactive garden program on its Stockton and Sacramento campuses. In 2019, Pacific was ranked eighth for the sustainability of campus buildings by the Association for Advancement of Sustainability in Higher Education. In 2021 and 2022, Pacific was ranked among the top 10 universities in the world for sustainable food and dining practices on college campuses.

Pacific installed solar panels over eight parking lots on the Stockton campus, which provide 30% of the campus's energy needs. The project, which was completed in April 2022, also involved the installation of 16 electric car ports in a partnership with Tesla.

Student demographics 

As of 2022, the Stockton Campus had 4,594 students (3,278 undergraduates, 747 graduate, 569 first professional students). The San Francisco Campus had 694 students (16 undergraduates, 180 graduate, 498 first professional students), and the Sacramento Campus had 989 students (478 graduate, 511 first professional students).

Academics 

Pacific is accredited by the WASC Senior College and University Commission and offers more than 80 undergraduate areas of study, including 12 accelerated programs, more than 30 graduate and professional programs in 10 schools and colleges, and a continuing education program.

The university's 10 schools and colleges are:

 Arthur A. Dugoni School of Dentistry: San Francisco
 Benerd College: Stockton, Sacramento, and San Francisco.
 College of the Pacific: The university's school of arts and sciences (liberal arts), Stockton
 Conservatory of Music: The first conservatory of music on the west coast, Stockton
 Eberhardt School of Business: Stockton 
 The Graduate School: Stockton, Sacramento and San Francisco
  Thomas J. Long School of Pharmacy: Stockton
 McGeorge School of Law: Sacramento
 School of Engineering and Computer Science: Stockton
 School of Health Sciences: Sacramento

Admissions

Undergraduate admission to University of the Pacific is rated as "more selective" by U.S. News & World Report. For fall 2021, Pacific received 10,854 freshmen applications; 8,606 were admitted (79%). The average GPA of enrolled freshmen was 3.82, while the average SAT score was 1247.

Rankings

The 2023 U.S. News & World Report ranking of U.S. colleges and universities ranked University of the Pacific No. 151 in the "Top National Universities" category. Also for 2023, USN&WR ranked Pacific 56th in "Best Value School," 82nd for "Social Mobility" and No. 100 for "Best College for Veterans." The 2022 Wall Street Journal/Times Higher Education College Rankings ranked Pacific 19th for "Best Universities in the West." In 2022 the Georgetown University Center on Education and the Workforce ranked Pacific No. 1 in the U.S. in career earnings for low-income students who attend colleges that enroll high percentages of Pell Grant Recipients.

Athletics 

Pacific had previously competed in the NCAA Division II California Collegiate Athletic Association conference but left in 1950. In 1952, Pacific became a charter member of the California Basketball Association, which soon became the West Coast Athletic Conference (WCAC) and is now the West Coast Conference (WCC). They remained in the WCAC until joining the Pacific Coast Athletic Association, now known as the Big West Conference, in 1969 for football and 1971 for other sports. Pacific dropped football after the 1995 season and returned to the WCC in 2013.

Facilities on the Stockton Campus include the 2,500-seat Klein Family Field for baseball, the 350-seat Bill Simoni Field for softball, the 6,150-seat Alex G. Spanos Center for basketball and volleyball, Knoles Field for soccer, Chris Kjeldsen Pool and Pacific Aquatics Center for swimming and water polo, the Eve Zimmerman Tennis Center, and the Janssen-Lagorio Gymnasium and Performance Center.

University of the Pacific competes in NCAA Division I athletics as the Pacific Tigers in the West Coast Conference. After over 40 years of being in a conference (the PCAA/Big West) in which they were the only private school ever to have been a member, they returned to a league that is now composed exclusively of private, faith-based schools. (BYU is affiliated with the LDS Church, Pepperdine with the Churches of Christ, and the other seven members are Catholic.) The athletics department sponsors 17 sports: baseball, men's and women's basketball, women's cross country, women's track and field, men's golf, men's and women's soccer, women's softball, men's and women's swimming, men's and women's tennis, women's volleyball, women's sand volleyball, and men's and women's water polo. The university's two national championships have come in women's volleyball, a sport in which the school advanced to 24 straight NCAA Tournaments (1981–2004) and appeared in nine Final Fours (2 AIAW, 7 NCAA). In fall 2019, the university hosted the NCAA Men's Water Polo Championships, where Pacific finished as the national runner-up.

Administration 
On July 1, 2020, Christopher Callahan became the university's 26th president. Callahan, the founding dean of the Walter Cronkite School of Journalism and Mass Communication at Arizona State University, was selected after a nationwide search and a unanimous decision by the university's board of regents.

The president is selected by the university's board of regents. The board has up to 35 members, many of whom are alumni, and strives to include graduates of all three campuses and professional schools. Former members include former NASA Astronaut José M. Hernández and former San Diego Chargers owner Alex G. Spanos.

Fraternities and sororities 

About 10% of students are members of a social fraternity or sorority at University of the Pacific, where there are three on-campus social fraternity houses and three on-campus social sorority houses overseen by the university. In addition to the four social fraternities and three social sororities, there are four multicultural organizations. There are also a variety of professional organizations and fraternities.

Fraternities 

 Theta Chi—Iota Eta chapter
 Pi Kappa Alpha—Kappa Nu chapter
 Sigma Chi—Kappa Sigma chapter
 Beta Theta Pi—Eta Kappa chapter

Sororities 

 Alpha Phi—Iota Gamma chapter
 Delta Gamma—Delta Epsilon chapter
 Kappa Alpha Theta—Phi chapter

Multicultural fraternities 

 Omega Delta Phi—Alpha Nu chapter
 Xi Chi Sigma

Multicultural sororities 

 Gamma Alpha Omega - Sigma chapter
 Rho Delta Chi - Delta chapter

Professional fraternities 

 Alpha Chi Sigma—Chemistry: Beta Pi chapter
 Delta Epsilon Mu—Pre-Health: Tau chapter
 Delta Sigma Pi—Business: Lambda Mu chapter
 Kappa Delta Epsilon—Honors Education Fraternity: Delta Eta chapter
 Kappa Psi—Pharmacy: Gamma Nu chapter
 Mu Phi Epsilon—Music: Mu Eta chapter
 Rho Pi Phi—Pharmacy: Lambda Sigma Delta chapter
 Omega Eta Epsilon—Language: Alpha chapter
 Phi Delta Chi—Pharmacy: Alpha Psi
 Phi Epsilon Kappa—Health, Exercise, and Sport Sciences: Eta Kappa chapter
 Phi Mu Alpha Sinfonia—Music: Beta Pi chapter
 Sigma Alpha Iota—Music: Eta Omega chapter
 Sigma Gamma Epsilon—Earth Sciences: Eta Upsilon chapter
 Theta Tau—Engineering: Lambda Delta chapter
 Lambda Kappa Sigma—Pharmacy: Alpha Xi

Service fraternities 
 Alpha Phi Omega— Alpha Alpha Xi chapter, Section A-2, Region A - Installed 3/28/1981

Honor societies 
 Beta Alpha Psi
 Beta Beta Beta
 Mortar Board
 Omicron Delta Epsilon
 Phi Alpha Theta
 Phi Beta Kappa
 Phi Kappa Phi
 Rho Chi
 Tau Beta Pi

Notable alumni 

Arif Alvi, MS 1984, 13th President of Pakistan (2018–present)
Scott Boras, PharmD 1977, JD 1982, American sports agent specializing in baseball
Dave Brubeck, BM 1942, jazz pianist and composer
Connie Callahan, 1974, judge of the U.S. Court of Appeals for the Ninth Circuit
Pete Carroll, BS 1973, Super Bowl-winning head coach of the Seattle Seahawks, former head coach of the New York Jets, New England Patriots, and the USC Trojans
Tom Flores, 1958, Pro Football Hall of Fame inductee, NFL Super Bowl-winning coach of the Raiders and player
José Hernández, 1985, Former NASA Astronaut
Chris Isaak, BA 1981, American rock musician and occasional actor
Nemir Kirdar, 1960, founder of Investcorp
Janet Leigh, 1947,  actress, singer, dancer and author
Bridget Marquardt, MA 2001, model and actress 
George Moscone, 1953, California state senator and 37th mayor of San Francisco
Theodore Olson, BA 1962, attorney and 42nd Solicitor General of the United States (2001-2004)
Matt de la Peña, BA 1996, Newbery Medal-winning author
Irene Roberts (mezzo-soprano), 2006, mezzo-soprano with the Deutsche Oper Berlin
Brad Schumacher, 1997, 2005, Olympian: 1996 swimming, two-time gold medalist, and 2000 water polo
Robert D. Sharp, BA, seventh Director of the National Geospatial Intelligence Agency.
Alex Spanos, owner of the Los Angeles Chargers, real estate developer
Robert M. Widney, 1862, American lawyer, judge and one of the founders of the University of Southern California (USC)

See also 
 List of colleges and universities in California

Notes

References

External links 
 
 Pacific Athletics website

 
Schools accredited by the Western Association of Schools and Colleges
Educational institutions established in 1851
Pharmacy schools in California
Universities and colleges in San Joaquin County, California
Universities and colleges in Sacramento County, California
Education in Sacramento, California
Sports in Stockton, California
1851 establishments in California
University of the Pacific